Dyess may refer to:

Dyess (surname)
Dyess, Arkansas
Dyess Air Force Base, Texas
USS Dyess (DD-880), a U.S. naval destroyer